Majid al-Sayid Ahmed is a Free Syrian Army lieutenant colonel, who defected from the Syrian Army to the FSA. He holds the position of head of the Operations Department for the Southern Front and is also head of the Ghouta Commandos Brigade. He was elected for his current position in December 2012 during a conference held in Turkey.

References

People of the Syrian civil war
Living people
Year of birth missing (living people)